George Fairbairn may refer to:

George Fairbairn (rugby), Scottish-born rugby union player and English rugby league international
George Eric Fairbairn (1888–1915), British Olympic rower
George Fairbairn (politician) (1855–1943), Australian politician for seat of Fawkner 1906–1913